Port Darwin is the port in Darwin, Northern Territory, in northern Australia. The port has operated in a number of locations, including Stokes Hill Wharf, Cullen Bay and East Arm Wharf. In 2015, a 99-year lease was granted to the Chinese-owned Landbridge Group, a transaction that has since ignited significant national security concerns.

Locations
Stokes Hill Wharf operated as the main location of Port Darwin, and has had three wharves.

East Arm Wharf, opened in 2000. Panamax sized ships of a maximum length of 274 metres and a DWT of up to 80,000 tonnes are able to use the location.

Privatisation
Following the 2012 election of the Country Liberal party, the Territory sought to raise funds for unspecified purposes through the sale of public assets, including the Territory Insurance Office and Darwin Port. In order to accomplish the latter, the Territory made a request for expressions of interest in late 2014 and early 2015, resulting in thirty-three companies signalling their interest.

In October 2015, the Chinese-owned Landbridge Group won the bid for a lease of Port Darwin. The then Country Liberal-controlled Northern Territory Government under then Chief Minister Adam Giles granted the company a 99-year lease for A$506 million. The contract price is more than 25 times the profit the port had earned over the preceding two years, and Landbridge also promised to invest A$200 million over a 25-year period. Shandong Landbridge Group is a privately held company with headquarters in the city of Rizhao, Shandong Province, China, which is owned by Ye Cheng, a billionaire with close ties to the Chinese Communist Party.

The details of the unsuccessful bids were not disclosed, with the government citing commercial-in-confidence reasons, but sources conflicted over the nature of these bids. Some sources stated that the bid from the Landbridge group was the highest by a significant margin, while others stated that two bids, one from a European company and the second from an Australian were comparable.

Security concerns
Concerns have been expressed over this leasing arrangement due its strategic significance as part of China's Belt and Road Initiative. Concerns have also been expressed over the proximity of the port to a base where United States Marines are stationed on a rotational basis and to the Darwin International Airport, which is used jointly for military and civilian purposes.

In June 2019, development of a port at Glyde Point, 40 kilometres north of Port Darwin, to be utilised by both military and commercial interests, was suggested as a 'counterbalance' by Federal Liberal Party MP and chair of the Parliamentary Joint Committee on Intelligence and Security Andrew Hastie.

In August 2019, a proposal was launched by Federal Labor MP Nick Champion to re-nationalise the port, thereby ending Chinese control.

See also

List of ports in Australia
Port of Newcastle, another port with a 99-year lease with a Chinese control.
Naval Base Darwin

References

 
Darwin, Northern Territory
Ports and harbours of the Northern Territory
Ports and harbours of the Indian Ocean
Timor Sea
Transport in the Northern Territory